Acochlidiidae are a taxonomic family of shell-less freshwater gastropods (one of them Palliohedyle weberi lives in brackish water), aquatic gastropod mollusks within the clade Acochlidiacea.

2005 taxonomy 
Acochlidiidae was classified as the only family within the superfamily Acochlidioidea Küthe, 1935 in the taxonomy of Bouchet & Rocroi (2005). Palliohedylidae was in turn classified as the only family within the superfamily Palliohedyloidea.

2010 taxonomy 
Schrödl & Neusser (2010) redefined the taxonomy of Acochlidiacea in 2010, placing the family Acochlidiidae in the clade Hedylopsacea.

Genera 
According to Schrödl & Neusser (2010), there are three genera in the family Acochlidiidae:

Acochlidium Strubell, 1892
 Acochlidium amboinense Strubell, 1892
 Acochlidium bayerfehlmanni Wawra, 1980
 Acochlidium fijiiensis Haynes & Kenchington, 1991

Palliohedyle Rankin, 1979
 Palliohedyle sutteri - synonym: Acochlidium sutteri Wawra
 Palliohedyle weberi - synonym: Acochlidium weberi Bergh, 1896

Strubellia Odhner, 1937
 Strubellia paradoxa (Strubell, 1892) - synonym: Acochlidium paradoxum Strubell
 Strubellia wawrai Brenzinger, Neusser, Jörger & Schrödl, 2011

References

External links